Marco Di Paolo (born 5 November 1986) is an Italian professional footballer who last played as a defender for Atletico Piceno.

Born in San Benedetto del Tronto, in his youth Di Paolo played for Fermana, Ascoli, and Giulianova.

In his senior career, Marco Di Paolo has played for, among others, Botev Plovdiv (in the top flight of Bulgarian football), Martinsicuro, Vigevano, and Fermana.

References

External links

1987 births
Italian footballers
Botev Plovdiv players
First Professional Football League (Bulgaria) players
Expatriate footballers in Bulgaria
Living people
Italian expatriates in Bulgaria
Association football midfielders
Vigevano Calcio players